Zdravko Zdravkov is the Chief Architect of Sofia Metropolitan Municipality.

Biography 
Zdravko Simeonov Zdravkov was born on 27 September 1972 in the city of Pleven but he spent most of his life in Sofia. His interest in architecture came because of his father who was a professional landscaper and naturally directed his son’s interest to parks, landscaping of public areas and later on to architecture. Zdravko Zdravkov graduated in architecture from the University of Architecture, Civil Engineering and Geodesy in 1997. In June 2004, he was chartered with the Chamber of the Architects in Bulgaria under reg. No  02034. He speaks English and Russian.

Architect Zdravkov is founder of Architectural Bureau QUADRA 04 and Infraconsult Group. Since 2004, he has designed an automotive plant, Lovech stadium, workshops, railway stations, petrol stations, housing estates, houses, restaurants, a KFOR compound etc.

On May 16, 2016, Architect Zdravkov was appointed Chief Architect of Sofia Metropolitan Municipality, Architecture and Urban Planning Division. He won the competition for the position with his concept ‘Sofia – a city of and for the people”.

Awards 
In 2016 won first prize for a project implemented in the administrative service for the citizens and the business at BAIT Awards - Category Municipal administration. In 2011, architect Zdravko Zdravkov won an award for the automotive plant Litex Motors in Lovech in the Production and Logistics Buildings category of the Building of the Year competition. Automotive production is most technological, more so than aircraft and rocket production. Another design, that won an award for interior in 2006, was a restaurant in Pleven. The award was by the Construction and the City newspaper.

References

Serbian architects
People from Pleven
Living people
1972 births